The 1908–09 South Carolina men's basketball team represents University of South Carolina during the 1908–09 college men's basketball season. The head coach was J.H. Brown, coaching the Gamecocks in his first season. The team finished with an overall record of 0–3.

Schedule

|-

References

South Carolina Gamecocks men's basketball seasons
South Carolina
South Carolina Gamecocks men's basketball
South Carolina Gamecocks men's basketball